Yebo Yes United is a South African fourth division football club. The club currently plays in the SAB Regional League and is the Development and Feeder Club to Orlando Pirates Football Club. The relationship works two ways as Yebo Yes United develops players for Orlando Pirates and in exchange Orlando Pirates sponsor transport and on field equipment. The club is a fully competitive entity and can be classed as semi professional in nature. The club's home venue is Arthur Block Park in Mayfair, Johannesburg.

History
Yebo Yes United was established in 1999 as a development and feeder club to Orlando Pirates. The original club name and logo were conceptualised in order to reflect an association with South African telecommunications companies who sponsored the club at the time.

Rebranding
On 18 August 2015, the club rebranded in order to usher in a new era of professionalism. The club moved away from its initial branding concept of The Yes Men to become The Soweto Starlings. The Soweto Starlings concept reflects a tribal greater blue-eared starling bird, above a three dimensional ball framed within a two tone interlinking crest which represents unity.

Graduates
List of players that have come through the ranks at Yebo Yes United:

 Senzo Meyiwa, Goalkeeper
 Brighton Mhlongo, Goalkeeper
 Ntando Nkala, Goalkeeper
 Thabang Khasu, Goalkeeper
 Mbongeni Gumede, Defender
 Mthokozisi Dube, Defender
 Michael Morton, Defender
 Daniel Cardoso, Defender
 Tlou Segolela, Midfielder
 Benedict Vilakazi, Midfielder
 Gift Leremi, Midfielder
 William Twala, Midfielder
 Sipho Jembula, Midfielder
 Marco Jose De Silva, Midfielder
 Peter Manaka, Midfielder
 Lindokuhle Mkhwanazi, Midfielder
 Mduduzi Nyanda, Midfielder
 Raymond Maluleke, Forward

Honours
ABC Motsepe League (Gauteng Stream) Champions: 2005–06, 2006–07
SAFA Nedbank Cup (Gauteng Stream) Champions: 2007, 2008

Sponsors
Professional Football Club: Orlando Pirates
Gym Facility Company: Zone Fitness
Internet Service Provider: Afrihost
Bottled Still and Flavoured Water Company: aQuellé
Digital Design Company: Brown Productions

References

External links
South African Football Association

Soccer clubs in South Africa